Stein Gulch is a valley in the U.S. state of Oregon.

Stein Gulch was named in 1896 after one Julius Stein.

References

Landforms of Jackson County, Oregon
Valleys of Oregon